Pusti Hrib is a small settlement in the hills west of Ortnek in the Municipality of Ribnica in southern Slovenia. It lies on the main road from Ortnek to Sveti Gregor in the traditional region of Lower Carniola. It is included in the Southeast Slovenia Statistical Region.

References

External links
Pusti Hrib on Geopedia

Populated places in the Municipality of Ribnica